BSK is a three-letter abbreviation that may refer to:

Sports
 OFK Beograd, Serbian football club
 FK BSK Borča, Serbian football club
 FK BSK Batajnica, Serbian football club
 FK BSK Banja Luka, Bosnian-Herzegovinian football club
 FK BSK Ledinci, Bosnian-Herzegovinian football club
 BSK Saint Petersburg, a former Russian bandy club

Other uses
 Banashankari, a neighborhood in Bangalore, India
 Basingstoke railway station, station code
 Brake Standard Corridor, a railway coach type in the U.K.
 The British School of Kuwait
 Brödraskapet, a Swedish prison gang
 BSK Defense, a Greek manufacturer of aerial target and aerial observation products
 BSk, cold semi-arid climate
 BSK Jr. books, in the Bailey School Kids series
 ISO 639:bsk or Burushaski, a language spoken by Burusho people in Pakistan and India
 Bone Street Krew, a professional wrestling group